CSM Oradea, also known as simply Oradea, is a Romania professional basketball club, based in Oradea, Romania. The club competes in the Liga Națională, the highest level of basketball in Romania.

History
CSM Oradea was founded in 2003, but the team promoted to the first division in 2005. The team best performance was in 2012 when they reached Romanian Cup semi-finals and in 2013 when the team won the 3rd place.

In the 2012–2013 season the team finished on second place at the end of the regular season (23 wins and 7 losses) and qualify for the Play-offs. In the first round the team lost with 3–1 against  U Mobitelco Cluj Napoca, and then the team lost 3–1 against future champions Asesoft Ploieşti. The team played for the 3rd place against Gaz Metan Mediaş and won with 2–1.

In the 2013–14 season the team made its first European appearance, as they would play in the third tier EuroChallenge. It also made the Cup Final for the first time, as well as the Liga Nationala Final.

In the 2015–16 season, Oradea won its first Romanian national championship, after beating BC Mureș in the Finals. Following their historic achievement, Oradea played in the Basketball Champions League during the 2016–17 season and one year later, achieved their second league title.

Honours
Liga Națională
Champions (3): 2016, 2018, 2019
Runners-up (1): 2014, 2021
3rd Place (2): 2013, 2017

Romanian Cup
Runners-up (5): 2014
Romanian Supercup
Champions (1): (2020)

FIBA Europe Cup
3rd Place (1): 2021

Current roster

Notable players

References

External links
CSM Oradea
CSM Oradea on BaschetRomania.ro
Eurobasket.com CSMU Oradea Page

Oradea
Sport in Oradea
Basketball teams in Romania
Basketball teams established in 2003
2003 establishments in Romania